Donald Copeland (born February 11, 1984) is a former American basketball player and current coach. He is the current head coach of the Wagner Seahawks men's basketball team.

Playing career
Copeland played basketball under Bob Hurley at St. Anthony High School where he helped lead the team to two state titles, while also earning all-state honors in New Jersey. He'd play collegiately at Seton Hall under Louis Orr, and was named a Second Team All-Big East selection in his senior season. After graduation, Copeland would play professionally for nine seasons across Europe and in Puerto Rico.

Coaching career
In 2015, Copeland joined the coaching staff at Wagner under Bashir Mason as a graduate assistant before being promoted to a full assistant coach in 2017. In 2021, Copeland returned to his alma mater as an assistant coach under Kevin Willard for one season, before returning to Wagner to take the head coaching position when Mason departed for the head coaching position at Saint Peter's.

Head coaching record

References

1984 births
Living people
American men's basketball coaches
American men's basketball players
Wagner Seahawks men's basketball coaches
Seton Hall Pirates men's basketball coaches
Seton Hall Pirates men's basketball players
Basketball players from Jersey City, New Jersey
St. Anthony High School (New Jersey) alumni
Metropolitans 92 players
Turów Zgorzelec players
KK Bosna Royal players
Baloncesto Superior Nacional players
Leones de Ponce basketball players
Eisbären Bremerhaven players
Atléticos de San Germán players
JL Bourg-en-Bresse players
Capitanes de Arecibo players
Vaqueros de Bayamón players
BC Kyiv players
Piratas de Quebradillas players
American expatriate basketball people in Ukraine
American expatriate basketball people in France
American expatriate basketball people in Germany
American expatriate basketball people in Hungary
American expatriate basketball people in Poland
American expatriate basketball people in Bosnia and Herzegovina
American expatriate basketball people in the Philippines
Powerade Tigers players
Philippine Basketball Association imports